Ocnogyna loewii is a moth of the family Erebidae. It was described by Philipp Christoph Zeller in 1846. It is found in Asia Minor, Cyprus, Near East, Armenia, Azerbaijan, Daghestan, southern Uzbekistan, south-western Tajikistan, northern Iran and Afghanistan.

The wingspan is 27–28 mm. Adults are on wing from March to May.

The larvae feed Achillea, Chrysanthemum, Cirsium, Onopordum and Trifolium species.

Subspecies
Ocnogyna loewii loewii (Asia Minor, Near East)
Ocnogyna loewii armena Staudinger, 1871 (Armenia, Azerbaijan, Daghestan)
Ocnogyna loewii pallidior Christoph, 1884 (Kopet Dagh, Badhyz, southern Uzbekistan, south-western Tajikistan, northern Iran, Afghanistan)

References

Spilosomina
Moths described in 1846
Invertebrates of Cyprus